The Philippine International Hot Air Balloon Fiesta is an annual four-day air-sporting event. It is held each year between January and February at the Clark Freeport Zone in Pampanga. It is one of the longest-running aviation sports events in the Philippines.

Program 
The event attracts more than a hundred balloon pilots around the world. It also features skydiving, flag jumps, microlight and rocketry demonstrations, small plane fly-bys and fly-ins, remote-control airplane and helicopter flying exhibitions, freestyle aerobatics, precision manoeuvres, light airplane balloon bursting, ultra-light flying formation and flour bomb dropping, kite-making and choreographed kite-flying, hi-start launch gliding, control-line aircraft flying, pylon racing, banner towing, aero-modelling symposium and races between ultralights and motorcycles. An estimated 100,000 visitors locally and from around the world come in to see this event.

History

1994-1995
In 1994, three years after the eruption of the Mount Pinatubo, the tourism secretary Mina Gaborand, Sang-kee Paik, and British Airways General Manager, John Emery, and the German aviation enthusiast Max Motschmann; engineered the first ever Philippine International Hot Air Balloon Fiesta to help jumpstart the local economy and spirit of the Central Luzon region with the commitment of developing hot air ballooning as an aviation sport in the country and making the Philippines one of the leading sports aviation and travel destinations in the Asia Pacific region. The 1994 event originally organized by the Department of Tourism (DOT), the Hot Air Balloon Club, the Clark Development Corporation and British Airways initially began with 21 balloon pilots from 10 countries and one entry from the Philippines, represented by Capt. Joy Roa; the only registered Filipino balloon pilot at that time. The success of the festival in 1994 brought about an increase in the number of participants in 1995 to 27 balloons including a basketless one-man balloon and two entries from the Philippines. The 1995 festival also saw the introduction of ultra light planes to the events.

1996-1998
By 1996, responsibility of the event was transferred from the Department of Tourism to Air Ads, Inc. under the watchful eyes of Captain Joy Roa who is also an avid licensed balloon pilot. Between 1996 and 1998, the growing popularity of the festival was expanded to include other aero-sports activities such as sky diving, paragliding, motorized hang gliding, remote controlled model aircraft (aero modelers), and kite flying. Aerobatic stunts and precision maneuvers courtesy of the Blue Diamonds and later the Red Aces of the Philippine Air Force became a regular attraction of the festival.

1999-2003
Financial difficulties in 1999 led to the cancellation of the festival, but saw a resurgence in 2000 with 12 balloons and 18 light planes from Thailand, Japan and Singapore, all participating in an air rally which has become a regular component of the festivities. 2003 saw a change in the traditional ballooning format. Specially designed balloons in the shape of a flying newspaper from South Korea and a large dog from Japan made their debut over the Pampanga skyline. Balloon participation from Malaysia, South Korea, Japan, Germany, the United Kingdom, Sweden, Czechoslovakia, and the Netherlands drew crowds from around the world.

2004-2016
The Philippine International Hot Air Balloon Festival continues to be a popular international sports aviation event. The 2006 festival featured 30 multicolored hot air balloons and more than a hundred balloon pilots from Finland, Sweden, the Netherlands, Germany, the Czech Republic, the Slovak Republic, Hungary, the United Kingdom, Canada, the United States, Japan, South Korea, Malaysia, Singapore, Thailand and the Philippines. It also drew approximately 60,000 visitors to the event.

2017–2020
The 21st Philippine International Hot Air Balloon Fiesta showcased 30 hot air balloons from USA, Canada, Switzerland, Sweden, Belgium, Germany, United Kingdom, Netherlands, Hungary, Turkey, China, Japan, Thailand, and the Philippines. The award-winning Twinz Aerobatic Paragliders as well as former members of the British Red Devils also participated in the event. The Fiesta's main theme was "Exchange of Cultures," a tribute to aviation's contributions in "making the world smaller." Apart from aviation enthusiasts, the Fiesta also invited artists and performers from around the world - including Turkish folk dancers, carpet makers and ceramic masters; international singers from South Africa, Samoa, New Zealand, and Zimbabwe; and the Amganad Music and Dance Ensemble from Banaue, Philippines.

In 2020, the PIHABF was not held at its usual venue in Clark, Pampanga citing a "lack of government commitment" to be involved in the event amidst the COVID-19 pandemic. Instead, the organizers held a hot air balloon festival, which they dubbed as "Flying Carnival 2020", at the San Lazaro Leisure Park in Carmona, Cavite.

Since 2021
This fiesta went on hiatus in 2021, but there are plans to return in Clark.

See also
 Hot air balloon festivals

External links
Philippine International Hot Air Balloon Fiesta Official site
Hot Air Balloon Fiesta at Clark Freeport Zone at WN
 gmanews.tv/video, 1st Pinoy-made hot-air ballon shown off in Pampanga - 29 January 2008 (in Filipino)

References

Hot air balloon festivals
Festivals in Pampanga
Tourist attractions in Angeles City
1994 establishments in the Philippines
Recurring events established in 1994
Annual events in the Philippines
Sports festivals in the Philippines